Shahid Kaveh Metro Station is a station of Mashhad Metro Line 2. The station began operation on July 27, 2019. On August 9th 2019 official inauguration of station ceremony was held with the presence of Iranian vice president Eshagh Jahangiri.

References

Mashhad Metro stations
Railway stations opened in 2018
2018 establishments in Iran